The Air Forces Command ( (CFA)) is a command of the French Air and Space Force. It is headquartered at Bordeaux-Mérignac Air Base.

It is an organic command (commandement organique) which prepares units to carry out their missions, but does not have an operational role itself. Since September 2013, the former organic commands CFA and the Air Force Support Command (CSFA) were merged into CFA.

Brigades
CFA is organized in six brigades :

Fighter Brigade 
The Fighter Brigade ( (BAAC)) is responsible for all air defense, air-to-ground and reconnaissance aircraft (including Dassault Rafale, Mirage 2000-5F, Mirage 2000B/C/D, Transall C-160 Gabriel). In February 2016 it was commanded by Brigadier General (Air) Philippe Lavigne.

Units of the brigade include:
 Escadron de Chasse 1/2 Cigognes 
 Escadron de Chasse 1/3 Navarre (Nancy – Ochey Air Base (BA 133))
 Escadron de Chasse 2/3 Champagne (Nancy – Ochey Air Base (BA 133))
 Escadron de Chasse 3/3 Ardennes
 Escadron de Transformation Mirage 2000D 4/3 Argonne (Nancy-Ochey)
 Escadron de Transformation Rafale 3/4 Aquitaine (joint Air Force / Navy unit)
 Escadron de Chasse 2/5 Île-de-France (BA 115 Orange-Caritat) 
 Escadron de Chasse 1/7 Provence (Al Dhafra Air Base, United Arab Emirates)
 Escadron de Chasse 3/11 Corse (Djibouti–Ambouli International Airport, Djibouti)
 Escadron de chasse et d'expérimentation 1/30 Côte d'Argent 
 Escadron de Chasse 2/30 Normandie-Niemen 
 Escadron de Chasse 3/30 Lorraine 
 Escadron de Drones 1/33 Belfort 

Fighter bases include:
BA 116 Luxeuil - Saint-Sauveur Air Base. Air defence fighter base with 28× Mirage 2000-5F.
BA 133 Nancy – Ochey Air Base. Three strike fighter squadrons units with 68× Mirage 2000D, SAM sqns.
BA 115 Orange-Caritat Air Base. Air defence Escadron de Chasse 2/5 Île-de-France equipped with 10× Mirage 2000C and transition squadron equipped with six Dassault Mirage 2000B.
BA 188 Mont-de-Marsan Air Base. Two squadrons of Rafale B and Rafale C.

Projection and Support Air Force Brigade 
This brigade ( (BAAP)), is responsible for all tactical transport and liaison aircraft (aircraft and helicopters: Transall, C-160, Hercules C-130, A310/319, Dassault Falcon 50/900, Aérospatiale SA 330 Puma, Eurocopter Fennec, Eurocopter AS332 Super Puma, SOCATA TBM).

Airspace Control Brigade 
 Airspace Control Brigade ( (BACE)), is responsible for (Airborne early warning and control aircraft, and ground radar, ground-based air defense systems and missile defence, communication networks) airspace surveillance, constituting the Command and Executive System of Airspace Operations. Since 2007 the command, control and information systems network of the air force have been is integrated into the Joint Directorate of Infrastructure Networks and Information Systems (DIRISI)).

Air Force Security and Intervention Forces Brigade 
This brigade ( (BAFSI)), is responsible for units of the French Air and Space Force's commando riflemen (Fusiliers Commandos de l'Air, tasked with special operations, CSAR and target acquisition), amongst which the most elite is the Air Force Parachute Commando n° 10, C.P.A 10, unit of the French Special Forces. The BAFSI also includes the security units of the air bases (34 squadrons (of company strength) and detachments (of platoon strength)) and the rescue and firefighting personnel (called incident technicians and grouped into squadrons of company size);

Support brigades 
 Air Force Aerial Weapon Systems Brigade ( (BASAA)) provides the maintenance and repair of aerial weapons and target systems.
 Air Force Maneuver Support Brigade ( (BAAMA)) provides the ground-based engineer and logistics personnel (including expeditionary) needed for the sustainment of air operations.

These last two brigades belonged until 2013 to the Air Force Support Command (Commandement du soutien des forces aériennes, CSFA, located at Merignac), which maintained the armaments, systems, equipment, information and communication systems (CIS) as well as infrastructure; the CSFA supported the human element, the military logistics (supply and transport), wherever forces of the French Air and Space Force operated or trained. These two brigades are now subordinate to the CFA.

References

Commands of the French Air and Space Force